Igor Banović (born 12 May 1987) is a Croatian professional footballer who currently plays as a midfielder for HNK Zadar. 

He has previously played for Zadar, Domžale, Milsami Orhei, Lokomotiv Plovdiv, and Isloch Minsk Raion.

Honours

Club
Lokomotiv Plovdiv
 Bulgarian Cup: 2018–19

References

External links
 

1987 births
Living people
Sportspeople from Zadar
Association football midfielders
Croatian footballers
NK Novalja players
NK Zadar players
NK Domžale players
FC Milsami Orhei players
PFC Lokomotiv Plovdiv players
FC Isloch Minsk Raion players
Igor Banovic
Croatian Football League players
Slovenian PrvaLiga players
Moldovan Super Liga players
First Professional Football League (Bulgaria) players
Belarusian Premier League players
Igor Banovic
Croatian expatriate footballers
Croatian expatriate sportspeople in Slovenia
Croatian expatriate sportspeople in Moldova
Croatian expatriate sportspeople in Bulgaria
Croatian expatriate sportspeople in Belarus
Croatian expatriate sportspeople in Thailand
Expatriate footballers in Slovenia
Expatriate footballers in Moldova
Expatriate footballers in Bulgaria
Expatriate footballers in Belarus
Expatriate footballers in Thailand